Fern Tree can refer to:

Tree fern, a plant
Fern Tree, Tasmania, an outer suburb of Hobart, Tasmania, Australia